Mystery! (also written MYSTERY!) is a television anthology series produced by WGBH Boston for PBS in the United States.

The series was created as a mystery, police and crime drama spin-off of the already established PBS show Masterpiece Theatre. From 1980 to 2006, Mystery! aired mostly British crime series purchased from or co-produced with the BBC or ITV and adapted from British mystery fiction. In 2002, due to pressure to include more American material, a series based on the novels of US mystery writer Tony Hillerman was produced, but the vast majority of Mystery! programming has always been and continues to be British literary adaptations co-produced with UK-based production companies.

In 2008, PBS combined Mystery! with its predecessor Masterpiece Theatre under the umbrella title Masterpiece, which includes the sub-brands Masterpiece Classic, Masterpiece Mystery!, and Masterpiece Contemporary.

Edward Gorey, Derek Lamb, and the Mystery! opening sequence

Mystery! is noted for its animated opening and closing title sequences with original drawings created by cartoonist Edward Gorey and animated by Eugene Federenko, Derek Lamb, and Janet Perlman, with music by Normand Roger. A PBS veteran, animator Lamb had also created programming for series like Sesame Street, The Electric Company, and The Great American Dream Machine.

Gorey’s first attempt at creating a storyboard of the opening was estimated to run 10 minutes. Because executive producer Joan Wilson was looking for a 75-second sequence, Gorey was eventually asked to hand over the drawings and allow animators to use his work as inspiration. Gorey, known for his eccentric and stubborn nature, recounted:

The Lamb/Gorey sequence has changed several times since 1980. It consisted of a non-linear series of animated period country house tableaux. The scenes include a formal ball, a crowd of umbrella-toting funeral attendants, three investigators, a croquet game in the rain, and a moaning damsel in various scenes of distress. Over time, the sequence became more streamlined, shorter, and slightly more colorful. For the Hillerman episodes, the American flag was worked into the opening title sequence.

Today, the Masterpiece opening sequence is almost identical across the sub-brands. Each opening fades in and out of scenes of popular characters from each series. The Mystery! version still features the Gorey/Lamb characters.

Inception and early history
Mystery! was the second British anthology to come to WGBH Boston after Masterpiece Theatre. In 1979 Mobil Oil head of corporate affairs Herb Schmertz offered the idea of an all-British crime series show to WGBH manager Henry Becton. Mobil Oil was already the underwriter for Masterpiece Theater and had seen success with high-profile British series, including The Six Wives of Henry VIII and Elizabeth R. By 1979, WGBH was bringing in a diverse array of British programming, to the point that Mobil saw an advantage to creating a unique time slot for the crime/police drama genre. Mobil spent 2.3 million in 1979 and 3.2 million in 1980 toward the shows it sponsored on PBS, including for the kickoff of Mystery! Not everyone was especially enthusiastic over the genre division between Masterpiece Theater  and Mystery! Then Masterpiece Theater host Alistair Cooke initially bemoaned the loss of the crime genre:

One of Mystery!'s early successes was Rumpole of the Bailey. Other noted successes include The Adventures of Sherlock Holmes starring Jeremy Brett in the title role, Inspector Morse with John Thaw, Brother Cadfael starring Derek Jacobi, and Prime Suspect starring Helen Mirren. Agatha Christie sleuths Hercule Poirot (David Suchet) and Miss Marple (at various times Joan Hickson, Geraldine McEwan and Julia McKenzie) have also been featured.

Mystery! won both the 1988 Anthony Award and the 1991 Anthony Award for "Best Television Show".

Hosts
The first host of the show in 1980 was Gene Shalit. In the first broadcast, February 5, 1980, Shalit opened with the introduction: “Good evening. We’re about to set out on a series of entertaining mysteries—15 weeks of suspenseful, sophisticated, crafty conundrums that are darkly diabolical or amusing adventures with introductions that suddenly seem alarmingly alliterative.” Shalit left the show in 1981.

Vincent Price took the reins in Mystery!’s second year. Price’s introductions included haunted house gags, including walking through cobwebs and ducking under spiders and bats. He came to Boston twice a year to tape openings and closings for the show. Actress Katherine Emory called Price “the sweetest scary man I ever met". Price was in his seventies when he hosted the show, and eventually had to step down due to failing health in 1989.

Diana Rigg took over as host in 1989, and had the opportunity to introduce two mystery series in which she was the star: Mother Love and The Mrs Bradley Mysteries. Rigg had previously won a BAFTA Award for her work on Masterpiece Theater’s 1985 Bleak House adaptation. She left Mystery! in 2003.

Beginning in 2004, Mystery! aired without a host. When the show was re-branded under the Masterpiece umbrella in 2008, actor Alan Cumming became the host.

Funding trouble: 1996-2007
In the summer of 1995, Mobil announced that it would stop funding Mystery! at the end of the season. Its underwritten series Masterpiece Theater and Mystery! had been losing audiences for some time.

"Many times, over the years, we've watched our best mini-series debut with a flourish … only to see the audience gently or not so gently erode over the weeks," executive producer Rebecca Eaton said, citing last year's Middlemarch as an example.".

Although Mobil had been experiencing restructuring, cutting 1,250 employees, the company refused to blame its actions on cost cutting. The company announced that it would stay with Masterpiece Theater at least through 1999 though it didn’t leave as underwriter until 2004.  After the ExxonMobil merger in 1999, the company reoriented its philanthropic mission to support public health and environmental causes, dropping its commitment to public television. PBS had avoided adding 30-second advertisements before programming blocks, despite underwriters’ requests for more robust representation on the channel. Mobil swore that the decision had nothing to do with PBS’s hesitancy in implementing 30-second advertising spots for its underwriters.  Since 1980, Mobil had covered the entire cost of acquiring, repackaging and promoting British dramas for PBS, which had typically cost the company around $10 million a year. Without Mobil, Masterpiece Theater and Mystery! were left without consistent support until 2011.

As a result of Mobil's initial break from Mystery!, Eaton and her staff began looking for newer, more “relevant” stories to tell in both shows. They also looked to past successes for help. Prime Suspect had gained a strong following in the U.S. as well as England, so PBS re-ran Series 4 on Masterpiece Theater during the 1995-1996 season.

PBS shifted Mystery! in 2002 from its Thursday prime-time slot during the regular American TV season to Sunday nights in the summer. Mystery! continued as a summer series from 2002 to 2004 with shows like The Inspector Lynley Mysteries, Hetty Wainthropp Investigates and Foyle's War.

2008 format change
In 2008, the series was absorbed into Masterpiece (the former Masterpiece Theatre) and began using the banner Masterpiece Mystery! In addition, its theme music was changed. It now carries a signature theme based on its sister program's former theme. This version is hosted by Alan Cumming.

Rebecca Eaton reflected on the 2008 changes in an interview with Diane Rehm, citing Mobil’s departure, a competitive media landscape, and trouble branding Masterpiece Theater and Mystery! to new audiences. Eaton said:

“I realized that this ship of whom I was the captain was at risk of going down, and that I had to do something. And I truly did not know what to do and had no money to do anything anyway. But we got a grant from the Corporation for Public Broadcasting and PBS which we were pretty much allowed to do anything with...we spent it on doing some research into how people perceived Masterpiece. And discovered that they used to watch it, they loved it, they regarded it very highly. They weren't watching it so much anymore. They thought it was too hard to find...And a lot of people were put off by the title. They thought, oh it sounds like it will be very challenging. It sounds like homework....We didn't change the content because we realized whenever anybody, particularly younger viewers watched it, watched Madame Bovary or Sense and Sensibility or Bleak House, they loved it. It was just sort of getting past the rather forbidding title of Masterpiece Theater and the confusing anthology nature.”

In popular culture
Mystery! was parodied by Sesame Street'''s "Mysterious Theatre" sketches in the early 1990s, hosted by the Muppet character Vincent Twice (whose name was always said twice), a parody of Vincent Price.
 The 1990s Mystery! opening was parodied on a 1998 episode of fellow WGBH program Arthur entitled "Binky Rules."

List of series presented on Mystery!

American Mystery! Specials
The American Mystery! Specials featured three stories set in the United States. They were based on Tony Hillerman's Navajo Tribal Police stories featuring Joe Leaphorn, played by Wes Studi, and Jim Chee, portrayed by Adam Beach:Skinwalkers 2002 (1)Coyote Waits 2003 (1)A Thief of Time  2004 (1)

References

Bibliography
Eaton, Rebecca (2013).  Making Masterpiece: 25 Years Behind the Scenes at Masterpiece Theatre and Mystery! at PBS, Viking Adult.
Hilmes, Michele (2012).  Network Nations: A Transnational History of British and American Broadcasting. Routledge.
Knox, Simone (2012). “Masterpiece Theatre and British Drama Imports on US Television: Discourses of Tension.” Critical Studies in Television 7:1 (29-48).
Miller, Ron (1996). MYSTERY!: A Celebration, WGBH Educational Foundation, 1996. .
Neves, Sheron (2013). “Running a Brothel from Inside a Monastery: Drama Co-Productions at the BBC and the Trade Relationship with America from the 1970s to the 1990s,” PhD dissertation, University of London-Birkbeck.
Weissmann, Elke (2012). Transnational Television Drama: Special Relations and Mutual Influence Between the US and the UK''. Palgrave Macmillan.

External links
Official Masterpiece website

1980 American television series debuts
2006 American television series endings
1980s American drama television series
1990s American drama television series
2000s American drama television series
PBS original programming
Television series by WGBH
Edgar Award-winning works
1980s American anthology television series
Anthony Award-winning works
English-language television shows
1990s American anthology television series
2000s American anthology television series